Lieutenant-Colonel Sir Walter Henry Bromley-Davenport TD DL (15 September 1903 – 26 December 1989) was a British Conservative Party politician.

Early years
One of the four sons of Walter Arthur Bromley-Davenport (28 September 1863 – 5 November 1942) of Capesthorne Hall, Macclesfield, Cheshire, and his wife, Dame Lilian Emily Isabel Bromley-Davenport, Bromley-Davenport was educated at Malvern College.

Military 
He joined the Grenadier Guards in 1922. In 1926, he was British Army welterweight boxing champion, a fact usually mentioned on his election literature during his subsequent political career. At the outbreak of World War II he raised and commanded the 5th Battalion of the Cheshire Regiment.

Political career
He was Conservative Member of Parliament for Knutsford from 1945 until 1970, and was a Conservative junior Whip from 1948 to 1951. He lost his junior Whip position after kicking the Belgium ambassador down a flight of steps. He reportedly mistook the ambassador for a colleague whom he thought had left the Commons before the 10 o'clock vote. He was a member of the British Boxing Board of Control from 1953. He was appointed Deputy Lieutenant of Cheshire in 1949 and knighted in 1961.

Bromley-Davenport had an extraordinarily loud voice. He would startle new Labour MPs when they rose to make a speech by screaming "Take your hands out of your pockets!" On one occasion in 1956 he shouted 'Sit down!' at Otho Prior-Palmer, MP for Worthing, which the minister immediately did, as he attempted to speak at the same time as Davenport. When he entered an overcrowded train in Crewe, he walked up and down the corridor shouting "All change!". When everyone left he took a seat. He was also attacked by a man with an axe in his home. Davenport screamed "Don't let the NHS get me!" and the assailant fled.

Many years later, the late Lord Weatherill, who later in his Parliamentary career had been Speaker of the House of Commons, but who was a whip during the time he shared in Parliament with Davenport, described him as "one of the greatest disrupters of Parliament I have ever heard. The honourable Member for Bolsover (Dennis Skinner) would not hold a candle to him these days."

Family
His son, William Arthur Bromley-Davenport, served as  High Sheriff of Cheshire and Lord Lieutenant of Cheshire. The family seat is at Capesthorne, Macclesfield, Cheshire.

References

Further reading 

 "Sir Walter Bromley-Davenport", The Times (London), 1 January 1990, p. 12.

External links
Genealogy of the Bromley-Davenport family of Macclesfield, Cheshire
 Profile of Walter Bromley-Davenport at Cricket Archive.

1903 births
1989 deaths
British Army personnel of World War II
Cheshire Regiment officers
Conservative Party (UK) MPs for English constituencies
Grenadier Guards officers
Knights Bachelor
People educated at Malvern College
People from Macclesfield
Politicians awarded knighthoods
UK MPs 1945–1950
UK MPs 1950–1951
UK MPs 1951–1955
UK MPs 1955–1959
UK MPs 1959–1964
UK MPs 1964–1966
UK MPs 1966–1970